Cetrorelix, or cetrorelix acetate, sold under the brand name Cetrotide, is an injectable gonadotropin-releasing hormone (GnRH) antagonist. A synthetic decapeptide, it is used in assisted reproduction to inhibit premature luteinizing hormone surges The drug works by blocking the action of GnRH upon the pituitary, thus rapidly suppressing the production and action of luteinizing hormone (LH) and follicle-stimulating hormone (FSH). In addition, cetrorelix can be used to treat hormone-sensitive cancers of the prostate and breast (in pre-/perimenopausal women) and some benign gynaecological disorders (endometriosis, uterine fibroids and endometrial thinning). It is administered as either multiple 0.25 mg daily subcutaneous injections or as a single-dose 3 mg subcutaneous injection. The duration of the 3 mg single dose is four days; if human chorionic gonadotropin (hCG) is not administered within four days, a daily 0.25 mg dose is started and continued until hCG is administered.

It is available as a generic medication.

Medical uses
Cetrorelix is marketed by Merck Serono for use in in-vitro fertilization in all countries except Japan, where it is marketed by Shionogi and Nippon Kayaku. Aeterna Zentaris receives royalties on these sales and retains rights to develop cetrorelix for other indications. In IVF use it is injected daily after follicle stimulation has been initiated and evidence of follicle maturation is approaching; given daily it prevents an endogenous LH surge that would trigger an untimely ovulation prior to the hCG administration by the treating physician. As an alternative to the GnRH antagonist, also a GnRH agonist could be given, but agonist have to be started earlier to overcome the agonistic effect. Cetrorelix can be mixed with follitropin alpha without compromising their reported safety and efficacy.

Contraindications
The use of cetrorelix is contraindicated in severe renal impairment. It is not intended for women aged 65 years or older. Use in women with severe allergic conditions is not recommended. Use with caution in women with active allergies or history of allergies.

Research
Cetrorelix was under development for the treatment of benign prostatic hyperplasia, premenopausal breast cancer, endometriosis, ovarian cancer, prostate cancer, and uterine fibroids, but development for these indications was discontinued.

A study published in Nature Medicine found a link between hormonal imbalance in the womb and Polycystic ovary syndrome (PCOS), specifically prenatal exposure to anti-Müllerian hormone.  For the study, the researchers injected pregnant mice with AMH so that they had a higher than normal concentration of the hormone. Indeed, they gave birth to daughters who later developed PCOS-like tendencies. These included problems with fertility, delayed puberty, and erratic ovulation. To reverse it, the researchers dosed the polycystic mice with cetrorelix, which made the symptoms to go away. These experiments should be confirmed in humans, but it could be the first step in understanding the relationship between the polycystic ovary and the anti-Müllerian hormone.

In another study, over a period of 3 weeks, daily injections of cetrorelix were administered to 12 men in order to suppress testosterone levels. Testosterone levels were significantly suppressed as compared to a control group. During this time of suppression, increases in high density lipoproteins(HDLs) were seen. HDLs are responsible for removing cholesterol from the blood and higher amounts are correlated with increased cardiovascular health.

References

External links 
 
 

Fertility medicine
GnRH antagonists
Peptides
Merck brands